Charles Giordano (born October 13, 1954) is an American keyboardist and accordionist.  Giordano is known primarily for his work with Bruce Springsteen as a member of the E Street Band, replacing Danny Federici as the band's organist following the latter's serious illness and death in 2008 and as a member of Springsteen's The Sessions Band. He is also known for playing keyboards with Pat Benatar in the 1980s.

With Benatar he was usually billed as Charlie Giordano and played for five albums, beginning in 1983; his role in the band was praised by Billboard magazine.  With Benatar he was identifiable by his glasses and distinctive array of berets, blazers and 1980s-style ties.  Giordano also was a member of The David Johansen Group and went on to perform with Buster Poindexter and The Banshees of Blue.

As a session musician Giordano's playing has included Madeleine Peyroux's 1996 album Dreamland and Bucky Pizzarelli's 2000 album Italian Intermezzo; the latter's mix of opera, Italian folk, and swing presaged his appearance in the similarly genre-mashing Sessions Band Tour with Springsteen.  Giordano also participated in a 2002 revival of garage rock band ? and the Mysterians.  In 2008, he accompanied British singer Barb Jungr for a short stand in a New York City cabaret.

Tours with Bruce Springsteen
Seeger Sessions Tour with the Sessions Band (2006)
Magic Tour with the E Street Band (2007–2008)
Working On A Dream Tour with the E Street Band (2009)
Wrecking Ball Tour with the E Street Band (2012–2013)
High Hopes Tour with the E Street Band (2014)
The River Tour 2016–Summer '17 with the E Street Band (2016–17)
Springsteen and E Street Band 2023 Tour with the E Street Band (2023)

Discography

With James Carter
Chasin' the Gypsy (Atlantic, 2000)

With Bruce Springsteen
We Shall Overcome: The Seeger Sessions (2006)
Bruce Springsteen with The Sessions Band: Live in Dublin (2007)
Magic Tour Highlights (2008)
London Calling: Live in Hyde Park (2010)
Live from the Carousel (2011)
Wrecking Ball (2012)
High Hopes (2014)
American Beauty (2014)
Western Stars (2019)
Western Stars: Songs From The Film (2019)
Letter to You (2020)

With Pat Benatar
Get Nervous (1982)
Live from Earth (1983)
Tropico (1984)
Seven the Hard Way (1985)
Wide Awake in Dreamland (1988)
True Love (1991)

References

1954 births
Musicians from Brooklyn
Living people
American people of Italian descent
E Street Band members
20th-century American keyboardists
American male organists
American accordionists
21st-century accordionists
21st-century American keyboardists
21st-century organists
The Sessions Band members
American organists